The Office of the Integrity Commissioner for the province of Ontario is the office of the Legislative Assembly of Ontario responsible for preventing ethics violations before they occur for members of the Legislative Assembly.

Overview
The position was created by the province in 1988 with the passing of the Conflict of Interest Act (amended as Members' Integrity Act, 1994) in 1988. The headquarters for the office is located in Toronto at 2 Bloor Street West.

The office has other legislation that assists in its mandate to govern the actions of the members of the Legislative Assembly:
 Lobbyists Registration Act, 1999
 Cabinet Ministers and Opposition Leaders Expenses Review and Accountability Act, 2002
 Public Service of Ontario Act, 2006
 Public Sector Expenses Review Act, 2009

Integrity Commissioners
 Gregory T. Evans (June 29, 1988 – November 30, 1997)
 Robert C. Rutherford (December 1, 1997 – March 4, 2001)
 Gregory T. Evans (2nd term: March 5, 2001 – September 16, 2001)
 Coulter Osborne (September 17, 2001 – July 31, 2007)
 Lynn Morrison (August 1, 2007 – December 31, 2015)
 J. David Wake (January 1, 2016 – present)

Case summaries

References

External links
 Official website

Integrity
Anti-corruption agencies
1988 establishments in Ontario